Taiwan's largest natural lake is Sun Moon Lake. Its largest artificial body of water is the Zengwen Reservoir, formed by the Zengwen Dam. The majority of Taiwan's lakes have multiple functions such as irrigation, electricity generation, water supply and tourist attractions. The volume area of natural lakes tend not to be big.

Terminologies
In Chinese language terminology, smaller bodies of water (ponds) are designated the terms 「池」 ("-chi"), 「塘」("-tang") or 「潭」("-tan"); larger bodies of water are designated as 「湖」("-hu", lake) and 「沼」("-zhao", marsh); while bodies of water with multiple functions such as irrigation, electricity generation, flood control, etc are called 「水庫」 ("-shuiku", lit. water storage).

Lists

Natural lakes

Semi-artificial lakes

Artificial lakes

Former lakes

See also

 Geography of Taiwan
 List of dams and reservoirs in Taiwan

References

 
Taiwan
Lakes